Alan Tottoh (21 October 1944 – 15 February 2013) was a British boxer. He competed in the men's welterweight event at the 1968 Summer Olympics. At the 1968 Summer Olympics, he lost to Evangelos Oikonomakos of Greece.

References

1944 births
2013 deaths
British male boxers
Olympic boxers of Great Britain
Boxers at the 1968 Summer Olympics
Boxers from Manchester
English people of Nigerian descent
Welterweight boxers